Bai Qiuming (born August 30, 1994 in Anda) is a Chinese speed skater.

Bai competed at the 2014 Winter Olympics for China. In the 500 metres he finished 35th overall.

Bai made his World Cup debut in November 2013. As of September 2014, Bai's top World Cup finish is 3rd in a 500m B race at Salt Lake City in 2013–14. His best overall finish in the World Cup is 40th, in the 500 metres in 2013–14.

References 

1994 births
Living people
Chinese male speed skaters
Olympic speed skaters of China
Speed skaters at the 2014 Winter Olympics
People from Anda
21st-century Chinese people